"Shame Shame Shame Shame" is a song co-written and recorded by American country music artist Mark Collie.  It was released in June 1993 as the third single from the album Mark Collie.  The song reached #26 on the Billboard Hot Country Singles & Tracks chart.  The song was written by Collie and Jackson Leap.

Chart performance

References

1993 singles
1993 songs
Mark Collie songs
Songs written by Mark Collie
Song recordings produced by Don Cook
MCA Records singles